Kallikuppam is a locality in Ambattur (Ward 82 of Chennai corporation), which is a large neighbourhood in Chennai City.

History
Kallikuppam has developed from being a rural area along the Ambattur - Redhills high road to become one of the important residential localities of Ambattur and Closer to Villivakkam, Anna Nagar, Madhavaram, Puzhal, Padi and Avadi, . It was a part of the erstwhile Ambattur Municipality till October 2011.Now as per a G.O., Kallikuppam has become a part of the zone 7, Ambattur, of the Chennai Corporation. Kallikuppam has escalated itself from being a less-known suburb to a decent suburban centre with many iconic projects such as Lake Dugar Towers project Opp Tata Communications and is fast developing on par with the other localities like Anna Nagar. For instance proper roads with reflectors (seen only on ECR) have been completed and the Corporation of Chennai has been carrying on various infrastructure projects.

Government and politics  
Kallikuppam is part of the Ambattur (state assembly constituency) and Sriperumbudur (Lok Sabha constituency).

Amenities

Ambattur fire station is the nearest fire station.

Kallikuppam falls under the jurisdiction of the Greater Chennai Police, West zone, headquartered at Ambattur Industrial Estate.
Ambattur Police station. There is a police booth on Kadappa road in Kallikuppam and redhills road near ayappan temple.

Sir Ivan Stedeford Hospital is a modern multi-speciality hospital in Ambattur. The hospital is named after Sir Ivan Stedeford, the British industrialist and philanthropist. The hospital was inaugurated on 25 February 1966, and then managed by the AMM Foundation. It is situated 4 km from the Kallikuppam tea shop bus stop on the Ambattur–Avadi road, about a kilometer from the Ambattur—Red Hills Road intersection. There are many small hospitals and clinics available near Kallikuppam.

Transport 
Proposed Phase-2 from Puzhal to Vandaloor of the Chennai monorail will pass through Kallikkuppam with proposed stations at Ambattur O.T., Pudur and Kallikuppam. Though Kallikuppam has a good number of bus commuters, it still does not have its own bus terminus, however there is a pending proposal to set up a bus terminus at Kallikuppam. Bus services are there to/fro Poonamallee (62), Avadi (62), (77M & 77d) Koyambedu, Vallalar Nagar (248A & 248p), Tambaram(104), Villivakkam-Pudur (S43) (and few private buses to Kanchipuram and Red Hills). Recently operating (S67) Villivakkam to Kallikuppam. Share cabs remain the biggest logistics and transport service providers in Kallikuppam.

Roads
The Chennai-Tiruvallur High Road (CTH Road or NH205) passes through 3 km in kallikuppam and the Chennai-Kolkata highway is just about 7 km from the place making it a strategic location. On an average, about 40,000 passenger car units use the CTH Road.[16] The new Chennai Bypass road between Maduravoyal and Madhavaram passes through kallikuppam. It connects NH4 with NH5 and NH205 via kallikuppam.

Railways
The Chennai Central-Arakkonam railway line passes through Ambattur and has two railway stations in the neighbourhood. Ambattur railway station serves the residential areas and Pattaravakkam railway station serves the Ambattur Industrial Estate area. Suburban Broad Gauge EMU trains operate daily from Chennai Central and Chennai Beach to Avadi, Tiruvallur, Pattabiram Military Siding, Arakkonam and Tiruttani via Ambattur. By rail, Ambattur is 30 minutes from Chennai Central, 20 minutes from Perambur and 10 minutes from Villivakkam. Many fast EMU locals (suburban trains) towards Tiruvallur, Arakkonam and Tiruttani, stop at Ambattur railway station, but fast local trains towards Chennai central do not halt at Ambattur. By fast local train it takes 25 minutes from Chennai Central. There has been a long pending request to the extension of timing of a Passenger reservation counter at Ambattur.

Sports
Kannan Theatre near senthil nagar was closed and being converted to Dolphin Sports Academy. Parks include Thangal lake park near Anjalamaram, Krishnapuram Corporation Park (renovated in October 2009) and the Thiruvengada Nagar Corporation Park (opened on 11 October 2013), Chennai corporation Park Hindustan motor nagar (Kallikuppam) Opened.

Education

Schools
Some notable schools are
 J S Silambakudam - Silambam, Rajaji St, Om Sakthi Nagar 
 Kiddie Kingdom Academy, Rajaji St, Om Sakthi Nagar 
 Keerthi's School of Dance, Rajaji St, Om Sakthi Nagar 
 Velammal CBSE is located about 2 km from kallikuppam at Surapet on the Ambattur-Red Hills road
 Sharon Matriculation School
 Sree Saraswathi Matric School
 Infant Jesus matriculation school
 Govt. High school, Padasalai street 
 Satheesh Balaji Matriculation Higher Secondary School;

Colleges
Some notable Colleges near Kallikkuppam are
 Velammal Engineering College is located about 2 km from kallikuppam at Surapet on the Ambattur-Red Hills road.
 Annai Violet College of Arts and Science at Menambedu.
 Soka Ikeda College of Arts and Science for Women at Madhanankuppam
 Benson College of Hotel Management and Culinary Arts at Ambattur

Reference

External links
 Official site
 Chennai corporation homepage
 Ambattur
 CMDA Homepage

Neighbourhoods in Chennai
Suburbs of Chennai
Cities and towns in Tiruvallur district